Myron Willis Roderick (September 15, 1934 – December 28, 2011) was an American wrestler, head college coach of wrestling and tennis, and college athletics administrator. He competed at the 1956 Summer Olympics in freestyle wrestling. As a wrestling coach at Oklahoma State, Roderick introduced recruiting on a major scale in the sport of wrestling. He also established the foundation of what is now USA Wrestling. In 1976, Roderick was inducted into the inaugural class of the National Wrestling Hall of Fame as a Distinguished Member.

References

1934 births
2011 deaths
American wrestlers
Oklahoma State Cowboys wrestlers
Oklahoma State Cowboys and Cowgirls athletic directors
Oklahoma State Cowboys wrestling coaches
Olympic wrestlers of the United States
Wrestlers at the 1956 Summer Olympics
American male sport wrestlers
Oklahoma State Cowboys tennis coaches
People from Anthony, Kansas
Sportspeople from Kansas